Papyrus 116 (in the Gregory-Aland numbering), designated by 𝔓116, is a copy of part of the New Testament in Greek. It is a papyrus manuscript of the Letter to the Hebrews. The surviving text of Hebrews are verses 2:9-11; 3:3-6. They are in a fragmentary condition. The manuscript palaeographically has been assigned by the INTF to the 6th century (or 7th century).

The text of the codex was edited by A. Papathomas in 2000.

 Text 
The Greek text of this codex is too small to determine its textual character.

 Location 
The codex currently is housed at the Austrian National Library (Pap. G. 42417) at Vienna. The fragments are also commonly referred to as P. Vindob. G 42417.

As of June 2017, Martin Shkreli bought the fragments for an unknown price.

See also 

 List of New Testament papyri
 Epistle to the Hebrews: chapter 2 and 3

References

Further reading 

 A. Papathomas, A new testimony to the Letter to the Hebrews Journal of Greco-Roman Christianity and Judaism 1 (2000), pp. 18–23.

Images 
 Image from 𝔓116 recto, fragment of Hebrews 2:9-11 
 Image from 𝔓116 verso, fragment of Hebrews 3:3-6

External links 
 "Continuation of the Manuscript List" Institute for New Testament Textual Research, University of Münster. Retrieved April 9, 2008

New Testament papyri
6th-century biblical manuscripts
Biblical manuscripts of the Austrian National Library
Epistle to the Hebrews papyri